Mount Kulal is an eroded-down extinct volcano located in northern Kenya, just east of Lake Turkana.

Mount Kulal has been a biosphere reserve since 1978.

Mount Kulal is the only place where Kulal white-eye (Zosterops kulalensis) has been found.

See also
 List of Ultras of Africa

References

External links

Volcanoes of Kenya
National parks of Kenya
Extinct volcanoes
Biosphere reserves of Kenya
Pliocene shield volcanoes
Pleistocene shield volcanoes